Ciocănești is a commune in Călărași County, Muntenia, Romania. It is composed of a single village, Ciocănești. The island Ostrovul Ciocănești lies In the proximity of Ciocănești on the Danube.

References

Communes in Călărași County
Localities in Muntenia